KSFV-CD, virtual and UHF digital channel 27, is a low-powered, Class A Jewelry Television-affiliated television station licensed to Los Angeles, California, United States. The station is owned by Chicago-based Weigel Broadcasting, and transmits from the Mount Harvard Radio Site in the San Gabriel Mountains.

History
The low-power station was founded in 1989 as translator K24CM on channel 24, before changing from a translator to an LPTV as KSFV-LP in 1995, moving to channel 26 in 2001. On April 30 of that year, the station debuted Spanish-language programming targeted towards Central American immigrants. Sometime after that, the station moved to channel 6 to make room for KVCR-DT in San Bernardino, which had signed on its digital signal on channel 26. Because of this move, the station began marketing itself as an FM radio station (carrying a Spanish Religious service known as Guadalupe Radio), since the audio of analog TV channel 6 can be heard at the bottom of the FM radio dial at 87.75 MHz. The station received Class A status in 2009, as KSFV-CA.

On March 9, 2009, Venture Technologies announced that it had signed a leasing agreement with Mega Media Group to launch a Dance format on KSFV, thus ending the Spanish Religious format on the signal. Programming was to have begun on June 1, 2009, and it would have been patterned after Mega Media's New York City outlet WNYZ-LP and likewise, carry the "Pulse 87" brand. However, Venture Technologies has notified Radio World that it would not take Mega Media's offer and Mega Media ceased operations in October 2009.

After converting KSFV to digital, Venture Technologies maintained the channel 6 analog service by acquiring KZNO-LP in Big Bear Lake and moving Guadalupe Radio to the latter. As of July 13, 2021, analog channel 6 has been shut off per FCC notice.

Digital television

Digital channels
The station's digital signal is multiplexed:

References

External links

San Fernando Valley
Television channels and stations established in 1989
Low-power television stations in the United States
SFV-CD
Weigel Broadcasting